Home Bank may refer to:

 The Home Bank of Canada, founded 1903 and failed 1923.
 Home Bank, formerly CFF Bank, a subsidiary of Home Capital Group.
 HomeBank, a free and open-source personal accounting software package.